OPEN is a venue and conferencing, live music & events space in Norwich, England. It is situated in the city centre, at the top of the Norwich Lanes. It is a Grade II listed building which was previously the regional headquarters for Barclays Bank. The original building was refurbished and reopened in 2010 as the home for its namesake, OPEN Youth Trust.

History 
The original building was sold to Barlett Gurney in 1779 for the purpose of establishing the Gurney's Bank. Gurney also installed bullion safes in the former wine cellars. In 1896, 20 banks including the Gurney's Bank were amalgamated under the name of Barclay & Co Ltd. Barclays soon outgrew their premises and in 1926 a new building was designed with a huge banking hall, offices and strong rooms.

As a bank it was reputed to have had the longest banking counter in the UK, and became the regional headquarters of Barclays until it was sold to the Lind Trust in 2003.

OPEN Youth Trust 
After purchasing the building, the Lind Trust established a Youth Forum whose primary aim was to assess the needs of young people in Norfolk. In 2005 the OPEN Youth Trust (OPEN) received charitable status.  The charity currently relies on funding from grants and donations from Trusts, business and individuals.

The building has a capacity of 1,450 standing people in its live events area. In 2017, plans were submitted to increase this number to 1,800.

In April 2020, the OPEN Youth Trust went into liquidation.

References 

Grade II listed buildings in Norfolk
Music venues in Norfolk